Leighton Alfred (born 27 August 1962) is a British tennis coach and former professional player. As a coach he has worked with many British tennis players, including Dan Evans.

A left-handed player from Wales, Alfred competed on the professional tour in the 1980s. He featured as a wildcard in the singles main draw of the 1985 Wimbledon Championships, losing in the first round to Leif Shiras.

Challenger titles

Doubles: (1)

References

External links
 
 

1962 births
Living people
British male tennis players
Welsh male tennis players
British tennis coaches